Los Molares is a city located in the province of Seville, Spain. According to the 2005 census (INE), the city has a population of 2,874 inhabitants.
This town was the birthplace of Pablo Garcia Albano (1576 - 1639), priest and historian.

References

External links
Los Molares - Sistema de Información Multiterritorial de Andalucía

Municipalities of the Province of Seville